Tracy Harris Patterson, (born on December 26, 1964), is an American former boxer who became a two weight world champion. Born Tracy Harris in Grady, Alabama, he is the adopted son of former Golden Gloves and world heavyweight champion Floyd Patterson, turned Golden Gloves success into a solid pro career. He won the WBC super bantamweight title with a two-round TKO of Thierry Jacob and defended the title for two years before losing the belt to Hector Acero-Sanchez in 1994. He later won the IBF super featherweight title against Eddie Hopson in 1995. Patterson retired in 2001 with a pro record of 63-8-2.

Amateur career
As an amateur, Patterson won two New York Golden Gloves Championships. Patterson won both the 1984 119 Lbs. Open Championship and the 1985 125 Lbs. Open Championship. Patterson trained at the Huguenot Boys Club in New Paltz, New York by his adoptive father, former heavyweight champion Floyd Patterson, a two-time Golden Gloves winner.

Professional career
Patterson turned pro in 1985 and captured the WBC super bantamweight title in 1992 with a TKO over Thierry Jacob. Tracy and his father Floyd are the first father and son to win world titles in boxing. He defended the title four times before losing the belt to Hector Acero Sánchez in 1994. In 1995 he captured the IBF super featherweight title by TKO'ing Eddie Hopson, but lost the belt later in the year when defending against Arturo Gatti. In 1997 he rematched Gatti, but again lost a decision. He retired in 2001 after a draw with a career record of 63-8-2.

Professional boxing record

See also
List of world super-bantamweight boxing champions
List of world super-featherweight boxing champions

References

External links

 

|-

1964 births
Living people
American male boxers
People from Montgomery County, Alabama
Boxers from Alabama
Boxers from New York (state)
African-American boxers
African American adoptees
World super-bantamweight boxing champions
World super-featherweight boxing champions
World Boxing Council champions
International Boxing Federation champions